Étienne Morel de Chédeville (10 October 1751 in Paris - 13 July 1814 in  Villeneuve-Saint-Georges) was a 19th-century French playwright and librettist.

He wrote the librettos for the following operas:
1783 : La caravane du Caire by André Grétry
1783 : Alexandre aux Indes by Nicolas-Jean Lefroid de Méreaux
1785 : Thémistocle by François-André Danican Philidor
1785 : Panurge dans l'île des lanternes by André Grétry
1786 : Tamerlan by Johann Friedrich Reichardt
1789 : Aspasie by André Grétry

External links 
 Morel de Chédeville, Étienne (1751-1814) on idref.fr
 La Caravane du Caire, three-act opera presented in Fontainebleau

18th-century French dramatists and playwrights
19th-century French dramatists and playwrights
French opera librettists
1751 births
1814 deaths
Writers from Paris
Directors of the Paris Opera